Iris ensata, the Japanese iris or Japanese water iris (Japanese: hanashōbu), formerly I. kaempferi, is a species of flowering plant in the family Iridaceae, native to Japan, China, Korea and Russia, and widely cultivated as an ornamental plant. "Japanese iris" may also refer to I. sanguinea and I. laevigata, both native to Japan.

Description
The flower, appearing in midsummer, is purple with a flash of yellow on the falls. The bluish purple color of the flowers is an example of the copigmentation phenomenon.

Habitat
It prefers a boggy or marshy environment and soil with a low (acidic) pH. In favourable conditions it will eventually form sizable clumps.

Cultivation
Iris ensata is extensively grown as an ornamental plant in gardens and parks throughout the temperate zones of the world.

Iris ensata is highly prized in Japan. It is possible that it was introduced into Japanese culture in ancient times, in association with rice farming. Certainly it has been cultivated and hybridised there for at least five centuries. The  grows in the wet land and is the most extensively cultivated variety in Japanese gardens. According to the place where it was cultivated, I. ensata is classified into three strains – the Edo (Tokyo), Higo (Kumamoto Prefecture) and Ise (Mie Prefecture).

Upon being introduced to the west in the mid-19th century, a new chapter was opened in the cultivation of this species. In America it was intensively hybridised to produce many new cultivars. Perhaps the most influential breeders in the United States have been Arlie Payne of Indiana, the Marx family of Oregon, Arthur Hazzard of Michigan, and Currier McEwan of Maine. Between them they have produced plants with large blooms and a wide range of colours. In the UK interest in this plant has been equally strong. The national collection is held at the Marwood Hill Gardens in Barnstaple, Devon.

The following cultivars have gained the Royal Horticultural Society’s Award of Garden Merit:- 

'Aldridge Visitor' 
'Alpine Majesty'
'Barr Purple East'
'Caprician Butterfly' 
'Crystal Halo' 
'Flying Tiger' 
'Frilled Enchantment'
'The Great Mogul'
'Hue and Cry'
'Katy Mendez'
'The Mancunian' 
'Returning Tide' 
'Rose Queen' 
'Southern Son'
'Variegata'

Gallery

References

External links

Hanashobu Park in Sawara, Japan

ensata
Flora of Japan
Flora of Korea
Flora of Manchuria
Flora of the Russian Far East
Garden plants of Asia
Plants described in 1794